The 2015–16 Campeonato Nacional de Futebol Feminino was the 31st edition of the top division of the Portugal women's football championship. It started on 5 September 2015 and ended on 19 June 2016. Viseu 2001 ADSC  and União Recreativa Cadima were promoted to the category, replacing Leixões SC and FC Cesarense.

CF Benfica won the championship for the second time and qualified for the Champions League. Clube de Albergaria was the runner-up, and Valadares Gaia FC was third. Fundação Laura Santos and Cadima were the teams relegated.

Teams

First stage

Second stage
Points of first stage have been halved and rounded-up.

Championship group

Relegation group

Top scorers

References

External links
Season at soccerway.com

2015-16
Por
women's
Camp